Eliyakota Samualie (May 9, 1939–November 1987) was a Canadian Inuit graphic artist and sculptor.

Early life and education 
Samualie was born near Cape Dorset. Her father died when she was young, and she was raised by her maternal grandparents.

Career 
Samualie began drawing in the 1960s. The imagery in her work frequently included bird forms.

Her work is held in several museums worldwide, including the National Gallery of Canada, the Cape Breton University Art Gallery Collection, the University of Delaware, the Canadian Museum of Civilization, the Art Gallery of Toronto, the Winnipeg Art Gallery, and the University of Michigan Museum of Art.

Personal life 
Samualie never married, but raised one adopted child.

References 

1939 births
1987 deaths
People from Kinngait
20th-century Canadian women artists
Canadian women sculptors
Inuit women
Bird artists
Artists from Nunavut
20th-century Canadian sculptors
Inuit artists